Owen Temple (born September 4, 1976 in Kerrville, Texas) is an American folk and country music songwriter and musician based in Austin, Texas.

Career 
Work with producer and pedal steel guitar musician Lloyd Maines led to 1997's General Store and 1999's Passing Through. The year 2002 saw the release of the Phil Madeira-produced Right Here and Now.

In 2007 and 2011, Temple was a Kerrville Folk Festival New Folk Finalist, and he was the winner of the 2007 B. W. Stevenson Songwriting Competition.

Two Thousand Miles, a fourth studio project, was produced by Maines and was released on January 22, 2008 on El Paisano Records. A review in Allmusic noted "great lyrics full of insight and plainspoken poetry."

A fifth studio album, Dollars and Dimes, was released June 9, 2009.  It is a concept album focused on different regions of North America during hard times. In July 2009, the album was the No. 1 record on the Euro Americana Chart.  In August 2009, the album was No. 5 on the Freeform American Roots chart.

A sixth studio album, Mountain Home, was released April 26, 2011, and the songs on the album focus on small Texas towns and the eccentrics inhabiting them.

Stories They Tell, a seventh studio album, was released on September 24, 2013.

A book on songwriting, co-authored with Gordy Quist, titled Songfarmer: Writing More and Better Songs was published on November 1, 2015.

Dreamer: A Tribute to Kent Finlay, released in early 2016 on Austin-based Eight 30 Records, features Temple's version of Finlay's "Mines of Terlingua."

Artist discography 
General Store (1997)
Passing Through (1999)
Right Here and Now (2002)
Two Thousand Miles (2008)
Dollars and Dimes (2009)
Mountain Home (2011)
Stories They Tell (2013)

Writer discography

See also 
Music of Austin

References

External links 
Official Website
[ Entry on Allmusic]
Owen Temple Myspace Page

Musicians from Austin, Texas
American male singer-songwriters
Singer-songwriters from Texas
American country singer-songwriters
Writers from Austin, Texas
1976 births
Living people
21st-century American singers
Country musicians from Texas
21st-century American male singers